Vikramarka may refer to:

Mallu Bhatti Vikramarka (born 1961), Indian politician
Bhatti Vikramarka, 1960 Telugu film

See also
 Raja Vikramarka (disambiguation)